Ayako Uehara is a Japanese name and may refer to:

 Ayako Uehara (golfer) (born 1983), Japanese golfer
 Ayako Uehara (pianist) (born 1980), Japanese pianist